Full Force is a group of R&B performers and producers from Brooklyn, New York, United States.

Full Force may also refer to:
 Full Force (Full Force album), 1985
 Full Force (Art Ensemble of Chicago album), 1980
 Fullforce, a Swedish power metal band that formed in late 2008
Full Force (music festival), German music festival previously called With Full Force
 Full Force, a documentary made from the YouTuber "IDubbbz"

See also
 With Full Force, a metal, hardcore and punk festival held annually in Germany